Darold is a masculine name and of American origin. The masculine name Darrel, also used as feminine name Darrel (has 20 variant forms), is of Old English and Old French origin, and its meaning is "open; from Airelle".

Variants
Darold has 3 variant forms: Darrold, Derald and Derrold. Most common from 1940–1960, but not common at all.

Examples

Darold
Darold Ferguson, rapper better known as ASAP Ferg
 Darold Jenkins (1919–1986), American football player
 Darold Knowles, a Major League Baseball pitcher from 1965 to 1980
 Dr. Darold Treffert, a Wisconsin psychiatrist who has been studying Savant Syndrome for nearly 40 years
 Darold Williamson, ran the anchor leg on the gold medal-winning 4x400 meter relay team at the 2004 Summer Olympics in Athens

Derald
 Derald Langham (1913–1991), American agricultural geneticist, sesame researcher, and founder of the Genesa Foundation
 Derald Wing Sue, professor of psychology at Columbia University
 Derrie Nelson (Derald Lawrence Nelson), former professional American football player

Masculine given names